The UCF Knights  are the athletic teams that represent the University of Central Florida in Orlando, Florida. The Knights participate in the National Collegiate Athletic Association's (NCAA) Division I (FBS for football) as a member of the American Athletic Conference. UCF was invited to join the Big 12 Conference on September 10, 2021, and accepted the invitation later that day. The American Athletic Conference announced on June 10, 2022 that UCF had been approved for an early exit of the conference following the 2022-23 season (albeit with an increased buyout cost), permitting them to enter the Big 12 Conference for the 2023-24 season. Since men's soccer is not sponsored by the Big 12, they will play in the Sun Belt Conference beginning in 2023.

The "Knights of Pegasus" – as the nickname was originally called – was a submission put forth by students, staff, and faculty in 1970 who wished to replace UCF's unpopular original mascot, the Citronaut, which was a mix between an orange and an astronaut. The Knights were also chosen over "Vincent the Vulture," which was a popular unofficial mascot among students at the time. From 1993 through 2007, the teams were known as the Golden Knights. In 1994, Knightro debuted as the Golden Knights' official athletic mascot. Since 2014, the Citronaut has made a limited return for some "throwback" games in football.

UCF sponsors 16 varsity sports: 6 for men (baseball, basketball, football, golf, soccer, and tennis; the minimum number of men's sports required for a Division I school) and 10 for women (basketball, cross country, golf, rowing, soccer, softball, tennis, indoor track & field, outdoor track & field, and volleyball). UCF also used to sponsor a men's wrestling team, but it was discontinued after the 1986 season.

The Knights 16 varsity teams have combined to win 89 conference championships and two national championships as of the end of the 2020–21 school year. The women's volleyball team won in the AIAW Small College Division national title in 1978 and the football team was selected as national champions by the Colley Matrix in 2017. Neither of these titles came in NCAA sanctioned events as the NCAA does not award national championships in FBS Football and did not sponsor women's sports at all before 1982. One Golden Knights athlete, Aurieyall Scott, has won an individual NCAA championship. Scott won the 60 meter dash at the 2013 NCAA Indoor Track and Field Championship. The UCF cheerleading team (which not considered a varsity team) has captured three national titles at the College Cheerleading and Dance Team Nationals.

Athletic facilities on the campus include the 44,206-seat FBC Mortgage Stadium, the 9,432–seat Addition Financial Arena, 3,000–seat Venue, John Euliano Park, the UCF Soccer and Track Stadium, and the UCF Softball Complex.

Traditions and history

The UCF varsity athletic program was a charter member of the Sunshine State Conference in 1975. The school moved up to Division I in 1984. In its first years in D-I, UCF was a member of the American South Conference, merging into the Sun Belt Conference in 1991. Women's sports in Division I played in the New South Women's Athletic Conference until 1990, when the American South began organizing women's sports. In 1992, UCF joined the Trans America Athletic Conference (TAAC) in all D-I sports except football, which remained independent. In 1996, UCF was advanced to I-A (FBS) in football, and initially remained independent in football until becoming a football-only member of the Mid-American Conference in 2001, the same year the TAAC became the Atlantic Sun Conference (which rebranded itself as the ASUN Conference in 2016). UCF joined Conference USA (C-USA) in all sports in 2005, and the American Athletic Conference (The American) in 2013.

The university's first mascot was the Citronaut, which was designed by Norman Van Meter, the brother-in-law of FTU's then-president Charles N. Millican. The Citronaut made an official appearance on a university publication, the cover of the 1968–69 student handbook. The sports teams were originally known as the "Knights of the Pegasus" – UCF's first official mascot – beginning with their first intercollegiate competitions in 1970. The moniker was switched to "Golden Knights" in 1993 as a solution to poor merchandise sales. The mascot of the athletic teams is Knightro, a black knight with gold armor. The university has asked to be identified as UCF when being referenced as opposed to Central Florida. Television networks and other media outlets, most notably ESPN, have been slow to adopt this policy.

In 2007, UCF made major changes to its athletic program. A new "athletic village" on the north end of campus known as Knights Plaza was developed. It included new sports facilities such as the new UCF Arena (later CFE Arena and now Addition Financial Arena) connected to the existing Venue at UCF and a new 45,000-seat football stadium originally known as Bright House Networks Stadium, later as Spectrum Stadium and the stadium's nickname of Bounce House, and now as FBC Mortgage Stadium, a new softball complex, and the only Division I indoor football practice facility in the state. This made UCF the first school to ever open a new stadium and arena at the same time, for the 2007–08 season. It also includes Jay Bergman Field and UCF Soccer and Track Stadium. The area was built in a downtown style with four towers of student housing including approximately 1000 beds, retail and restaurant areas, and a new pedestrian mall connecting the front of the new arena to the student union, known as Memory Mall. To mark the start of the new era, the teams names were reverted to "Knights" from the "Golden Knights" on May 4, 2007. In addition, new logos and uniforms were unveiled for all of UCF's athletic programs.

Conference affiliations

Sports sponsored

Basketball

Men's basketball

UCF played its first intercollegiate basketball game before the team even had a nickname. In the Division II era, under Torchy Clark, UCF found great success including a DII Final Four appearance.

UCF has been a member of Division I since 1985, and has advanced to the NCAA tournament 4 times (94, 96, 04, 05), all under coach Kirk Speraw. UCF competed in the Atlantic Sun Conference (formerly called the Trans America Athletic Conference and now the ASUN Conference) from 1992 until 2005 when all sports joined C-USA, and plays in Addition Financial Arena. UCF made their debut in the C-USA Championship Tournament in the 2006 season, falling to Houston in the second round and closing out the season with the program's first losing record (14–15) since 2000–01. The Knights made a huge turnaround in the 2006–07 season, finishing 2nd in conference play to Memphis with an overall record of 22–9.

The UCF Men's Basketball team played its first exhibition game in the 9,400-seat UCF Arena (now Addition Financial Arena), with an 86–78 win over the Saint Leo Lions, on November 3, 2007. Their first regular-season game in the venue was a 63–60 victory over the Nevada on November 11. Their first home C-USA game was against the Tulsa Golden Hurricane on January 11, 2008. The game was won by the Knights in triple overtime. On December 1, 2010, the Knights upset the #16 Florida Gators 57–54 at the new Amway Center in downtown Orlando, giving the Knights their first victory over a top 20 opponent as well as their first victory over the Gators. Following a 10–0 start to the 2010–11 season, the Knights were nationally ranked for the first time in program history. At the time, UCF was one of nine unbeaten teams, and one of only four schools to be ranked in the BCS standings and the AP men's basketball poll.

Women's basketball

UCF first joined the AIAW for women's basketball in 1977–78.  To conclude the 1979–80 season, the team won the Division-II Florida State Championship, before falling in their first game of the national tournament. They were promoted to AIAW Division I in its last year of existence, 1981–82, and made it to that year's District I tournament quarterfinals, before joining the NCAA in 1982–83.

The women's basketball team made the NCAA Division I tournament in 1996 and 1999, and won the TAAC/Atlantic Sun regular-season title in 1999, 2003 and 2005, before joining C-USA.  In 2009, UCF's women's basketball team shocked the C-USA by going 11–5 in conference play after going 2–11 in non-conference games and 10–20 the previous year, and swept through the 2009 Conference USA women's basketball tournament, dominating Southern Miss in overtime to win the championship game, 65–54, and earn its third Division I tournament appearance.

Baseball

The baseball team is led by head coach, Terry Rooney who will entered his first season as head coach in 2009. Jay Bergman had been head coach since 1976 but was fired on May 1, 2008, after allegations arose of sexual harassment towards a male equipment coach. Bergman had a large amount of success in this position, leading UCF to Atlantic Sun Championships in 93, 95, 96, 97, 00, 01, 02, 04 and NCAA Regional Appearances in 89, 93, 95, 96, 97, 00, 01, 02, 04, and brought UCF to a national ranking of #8 in 2001. In honor of his long-term success with the Knights, on February 3, 2001, UCF opened and dedicated what is now John Euliano Park.

Football

UCF fielded an official varsity football team for the first time in 1979, under head coach Don Jonas.  Since then, the Knights have played in six bowl games, won six conference championships, produced 2 All-Americans, and two first-round draft picks. UCF has had some measure of success in football in its short NCAA history. It is the alma mater for NFL stars Brandon Marshall, Daunte Culpepper, Asante Samuel, Leger Douzable, and Bruce Miller among others. While UCF football can be traced back to its days as an NCAA Division III team under Jonas, it quickly moved up to Division II in 1982, and Division I-AA in 1990, finally matching the rest of its sports programs. In 1996, the program made its final ascension into Division I-A, now known as the Football Bowl Subdivision (FBS) of the National Collegiate Athletic Association (NCAA). UCF football plays as a member of The American, where it has been a member since the 2013 season. The Knights play their home games at FBC Mortgage Stadium, the team's home field since 2007.

The Knights' most prominent historical football rivals are conference foes East Carolina and Tulsa, and former Conference USA rival Marshall. UCF's current main rival is in-state conference foe South Florida. For the beginning of the rivalry's existence, it was an inter-conference contest when South Florida was in the Big East and UCF in C-USA. Both schools are now members of the American Athletic Conference and play on Black Friday each year.

Since beginning play in 1979, the Knights have won three conference championships and four conference division titles. UCF won the C-USA East Division in 2005, 2007, 2010 and 2012, winning the conference championship game in 2007 and 2010. The Knights were also champions of The American in 2013. Before ascending to the FBS, UCF was a leading program in Division I-AA in the early 1990s. In 1990, UCF became the first school in history to qualify for the I-AA playoffs in its first season of eligibility. The Knights once again made the postseason in 1993, and were selected as the preseason No. 1 to start the 1994 season.

George O'Leary became UCF's head football coach in 2004 and had great success. The 2005 team won the school's first division championship, and earned their first trip to a bowl game, in the Knights first season in C-USA. In 2007, the Knights won their second division championship, and earned their first conference championship. During the 2009 campaign, UCF earned its first victory over a ranked opponent and third bowl appearance under O'Leary's watch. In 2010 earned their first top 25 ranking, second conference championship, and winning their first bowl game. In 2013, UCF went undefeated in conference play to win The American's conference championship in its inaugural season, earning the conference's automatic berth to a BCS game. The fifteenth-ranked Knights upset the sixth-ranked Baylor Bears 52–42 in the 2014 Fiesta Bowl to secure the program's first win a major bowl game, and pull off one of the biggest upsets of the BCS era. UCF finished the 2013 campaign by earning the program's first top-ten ranking, and with quarterback Blake Bortles being selected third overall by the Jacksonville Jaguars in the 2014 NFL Draft. Scott Frost became the head coach in 2016 as O'Leary effectively resigned from the program midway through the season in 2015.

UCF defeated #7 Auburn 34–27 in the 2018 Peach Bowl on January 1, 2018, to secure the school's second major bowl victory.  Citing the only undefeated season in the FBS, UCF administrators claimed a national championship football season on January 7 (the day before the College Football Playoff National Championship Game). The Colley Matrix, an NCAA recognized selector, selected UCF as the top team in the country on January 9. It was the only selector to do so, as all other recognized selectors chose the winner of the College Football Playoff National Championship, the University of Alabama. The NCAA record book places UCF under the "Final National Poll Leaders" section, but since the beginning of the BCS era in 1998 has reserved the term "National Champions" for winners of the BCS, College Football Playoff, AP Poll, or Coaches Poll. UCF is the only team which actively claims a national championship that was not awarded by one of these polls since the beginning of the BCS era.

Golf
The men's golf team was formed in 1979, and has appeared in NCAA Regionals 12 times, and have played in for the NCAA Championship four times. The last time the squad reached the championship was in 2009. The 2010 men's golf team were C-USA champions. The women's golf team was founded in 1982, and has made 9 NCAA Regional appearances, and has played for two NCAA Championship in 1996 and 2018.

Bryce Wallor is the head coach for the men's golf team, and Courtney Trimble is the head coach for the women's team. The Knights men's golf team plays its home matches at the Rio Pinar Country Club. The Knights women's golf team plays its home matches at the RedTail Golf Course. The Knight's golf teams practice at the UCF Golf Practice Facility, located near the UCF campus at the Twin Rivers Golf Club in Oviedo.

Numerous former Knight golfers have represented the UCF on the PGA and LPGA Tours, including Robert Damron and Cliff Kresge.

Women's rowing
The women's rowing team was formed in 1995. They have won 5 consecutive American Athletic Conference (AAC) Rowing championships, and have appeared in 6 NCAA Championships. The team matched their highest placement (18th overall) in their most recent 2019 appearance. This included their highest ever boat placement with the Varsity 4 boat coming in 14th. The team sit with UCONN Women's Basketball and USF Women's Soccer as the only sports in the AAC to win 5 consecutive conference championships. The 2020 season begun briefly with a sweep at the metro cup regatta, but was ended early due to COVID-19.

The Coaching team consists of Head Coach Becky Cramer and includes Assistant Coaches Rachel Klunder (Director of Operations), Mari Sundbo, and Montia Rice.

Soccer

UCF has produced a number of soccer stars. Most notably, Michelle Akers and Kim Wyant. Akers and Wyant were founding players on the United States women's national soccer team from 1985 to 2000. Akers helped them win the FIFA Women's World Cup in 1991 and 1999, and the 1996 Summer Olympics. Her career was so distinguished that Pelé named her among only two female players (along with teammate Mia Hamm) on the FIFA 100 list of the greatest living soccer players in 2004.

The women's program made the final of the first official women's intercollegiate soccer championship ever held in 1981, as well as the first NCAA Division I Women's Soccer Championship in 1982, losing the final in each year by the identical score of 1–0 to North Carolina.

The men's program has developed midfielder Eric Vasquez, who made his professional soccer debut with the Columbus Crew Major League Soccer. Vasquez later played for Miami FC in the United Soccer Leagues' First Division and the Orlando Sharks of the Major Indoor Soccer League before retiring due to injury. As well, former Knights Goalkeeper Ryan McIntosh initially signed a development deal with D.C. United of MLS. After a year with the D.C. United Reserve team, McIntosh signed with the Atlanta Silverbacks of USL Division One, where he led the team to the league final. The Silverbacks ended up losing to the Seattle Sounders. Both players were a part of the 2004 Central Florida Kraze amateur soccer team that won the Premier Development League's championship by defeating the Boulder Rapids Resevers, 1–0 at the UCF soccer stadium.

Former UCF goalkeeper Sean Johnson joined the Chicago Fire of Major League Soccer in 2010. He made his pro debut on August 1 and defeated the LA Galaxy. He was a member of the United States U-20 men's national soccer team which qualified for the 2009 FIFA U-20 World Cup in Egypt. On the women's team, Aline Reis, an All-American in her freshman year in 2008, was selected to the Brazil women's national football team for the first time in 2009, playing in a friendly against a local Brazilian team in July. Former women's goalkeeper Lynzee Lee played for the Buffalo Flash of the W-League. In 2010, both the men's and women's soccer teams advanced to the NCAA Tournament.

Softball

The Knights softball program was founded in 2002, and the team officially started competing in the Atlantic Sun Conference in that same year under head coach Renee Luers-Gillispie.  Since the program began, the Knights have won two conference tournament champions, and have appeared in the NCAA tournament three times.

Renee Luers-Gillispie, who is in her tenth year with the team, has been the programs only head coach. Through the conclusion of the 2010 season, Gillispie has led the Knights to a record of 341–233–1 during her tenure, and she has an overall win–loss record of 593–437–3 during her seventeen seasons as a head coach.

The Knights softball team plays its home games at the UCF Softball Complex.

Tennis
The men's tennis team was formed in 1970. They reached the NCAA Division II Championship consecutively from 1974 to 1978, including a third-place finish in 1977. They won the A-Sun Championship three times from 2003 to 2005 under Bobby Cashman. The current men's coach is John Roddick, brother and coach for former tennis pro Andy Roddick.

The women's tennis team was formed in 1972. They have had 3 NCAA Division 1 Tournament appearances.

Track and field

The Knights women's track and field team has won ten total conference championships, eight in their nine years in the Atlantic Sun Conference, and won the 2010, 2011, 2012 and 2013 C-USA outdoor title, and the 2011 C-USA indoor title. In 2011, the Knights were nationally ranked for the first time in program history, while at the same time ranking as the top team in the state, rising as high as No. 8 in the polls.

The head coach for the track and field program is Caryl Smith Gilbert, and the assistant coaches are Jeff Chakouian, Paul Brown and LaTonya Loche. Gilbert has coached four All-Americans during her tenure at UCF, including two-time All-American Jackie Coward.

The Knights track and field teams hold their outdoor home meets at the UCF Soccer and Track Stadium, which is part of Knights Plaza.

Former Sports

Wrestling 
From 1970–1986, UCF sponsored a men's wrestling program. The team qualified for the NCAA Division II championship in 1979 and 1984, finishing in 26th and 29th respectively; and the Division I championship in 1986, finishing 71st. The team was discontinued after 1986 due to financial reasons.

National championships 
Two Knights teams have won national championships, though neither was bestowed by the NCAA.  The 1978 women's volleyball team captured UCF's first national team championship, three years before the NCAA began governing women's sports. The team won the AIAW Small College Division championship as Florida Technological University  within days of university leadership's vote to change the school's name. 

In 2017 the UCF Knights football team went undefeated and was selected by Dr. Wesley Colley's math system as its top team. His Colley Matrix is one of more than 40 polls, rankings, and formulas recognized by the NCAA in its list of college football's "national poll leaders" chosen by major selectors. Its selections since 1992 are recognized by the NCAA. The extent of NCAA recognition of all major selectors is in the form of acknowledgment in the annual NCAA Football Guide of the unofficial national champions. However, UCF was not selected to play in the College Football Playoff in 2017; all major selectors except for Colley Matrix chose Alabama as the 2017 national champion.

Two Knights athletes have won individual national titles as well, one of which came in an NCAA-sanctioned event. The first was when Aurieyall Scott won the 60-meter dash at the 2013 NCAA Women's Indoor Track and Field Championship. The other title came when Trey Hilderbrand won the Men's Singles title in the 2020 ITA Fall Indoor National Championship.

NCAA championships 

 Individual (1)
 Aurieyall Scott – 2013 NCAA Division I Women's Indoor Track and Field: 60-meter dash

Non-NCAA championships 

 Team (2)
 Men (1)
 Football (FBS): 2017 (non-consensus champion, Colley Matrix)
 Women (1)
 Volleyball (AIAW Small College Division): 1978
 Individual (1)
 Trey Hilderbrand – 2020 ITA Indoor National Fall Championship: Men's Singles

Club sports
The University of Central Florida through the Recreation and Wellness Center and the student government also fields a number of club sports of varying degrees of competitiveness, though most compete only with other teams from the southeastern part of the country. These sports are funded by the university's student government association. The club sports include bass fishing, bowling, running,  cycling, fencing, golf, ice hockey, judo, jiu-jitsu, kiteboarding, lacrosse, paintball,  racquetball, rugby, sailing, surfing, table tennis, taekwondo, team handball, tennis, triathlon, ultimate frisbee, men's volleyball, water polo, water skiing, wheelchair basketball, and wrestling.

Ice hockey
UCF's ice hockey team was founded in 1997 and competes in the Southern Collegiate Hockey Conference in Division II of the American Collegiate Hockey Association. The team plays its home games at the RDV Sportsplex in Maitland, Florida. Since becoming head coach in 1999, Sean Weaver led the Knights to eight consecutive national tournament appearances, and placed 3rd in the 2007–08 and 2010–11 seasons.

Lacrosse
UCF's men's lacrosse teams compete in the SouthEastern Lacrosse Conference of the Men's Collegiate Lacrosse Association  at the Division I level. The team was founded in 1997 and plays at the university's intramural fields. It is currently coached by Austin Ricci.

Rugby
Founded in 1988, UCF's Rugby Club plays in Division I of college rugby in the South Independent Conference against local rivals such as Florida State and South Florida. The Knights are led by Head Coach Jason Granich but has recently been changed to Raoul Besse. The Knights have enjoyed a lot of success over the last couple of years thanks to hard work, coaching, and some of the best conditioning in the league. They are back-to-back national champions in D1-AA and have won a handful of Rugby Sevens tournaments. The trajectory of the 2015 season is looking positive with the Knights qualifying for the National Sevens Championship, ranked number one in the SIRC South Division, and ranked 7th in the entire nation.

The Knights have had one of the better college rugby programs in Florida in recent years. In Fall 2011, UCF reached the finals of the Collegiate Rugby Florida Cup. The Knights finished the 2011–12 season ranked 17th with a record of 12–5, including splitting the season series against No. 6 ranked FSU.

In spring 2013, the Knights won the DI-AA national championship. They defeated Tennessee 31–17 in the round of 16, defeated Clemson 24–20 in the quarterfinals, and defeated Dartmouth 45–38 in the semifinals. UCF won the national championship by defeating Lindenwood in the final 27–25, with team captain Gerhard Veit also scoring two tries.

UCF repeated in 2014 as D1-AA national champion. They beat South Carolina in the quarterfinals (44-28) and San Diego in the semifinals(43-5). UCF defeated Arizona in the final behind the efforts of MVP Scott Watters. The final score was an impressive 64–13.

UCF has also had success in rugby sevens. UCF rugby won the first tournament in Estero in the Fall 2012 Florida Sevens Championship with a 4–0 record, including a 24–5 win over FSU in the final. The Knights went undefeated and beat UNF 36–15 in the final to win the 2012 Florida Cup. The Knights continued this in the 2015 tournament. The Knights (who were the lowest seed) dominated the top ranked team, Middle Tennessee with the final score 31–7. The Knights would go on to win all there matches, including the championship game against Georgia Tech edging them out 19–12.

War on I-4 rivalry

UCF's main rival is the University of South Florida Bulls, who are located 98 miles southwest in Tampa. The first meeting between the two schools was a baseball game in 1971, where the South Florida Golden Brahmans beat the Florida Tech Knights of the Pegasus 5–1. The close geographic proximity and the schools being founded around the same time (South Florida in 1956 and Central Florida in 1963) made the schools naturally become rivals. The two schools became conference foes for the first time in 2013, when UCF joined the American Athletic Conference. The rivalry gets its name from Interstate 4, which runs through both Tampa and Orlando.

The rivalry was officially recognized by both schools on September 21, 2016, when it was announced that a rivalry series between all 14 sports that both schools sponsor would begin (USF is the only one of the two schools to offer men's cross country, women's sailing, and men's track & field while UCF is the only one of the two schools to offer women's rowing). Each sport is worth six total points, and sports where the teams meet head to head multiple times in the regular season will have the six points divided by the number of games played, meaning the point system typically grants:

 2 points to the winner of each regular season baseball game (3 games per year)
 3 points to the winner of each regular season men's basketball game (2 games per year)
 3 points to the winner of each regular season women's basketball game (2 games per year)
 6 points to the higher finisher at the American Athletic Conference Women's Cross Country Championship
 6 points to the winner of the annual football game
 6 points to the higher finisher at the American Athletic Conference Men's Golf Championship
 6 points to the higher finisher at the American Athletic Conference Women's Golf Championship
 6 points to the winner of the annual regular season men's soccer match (3 points awarded to each side in the event of a draw)
 6 points to the winner of the annual regular season women's soccer match (3 points awarded to each side in the event of a draw)
 2 points to the winner of each regular season softball game (3 games per year)
 6 points to the winner of the annual regular season men's tennis match.
 6 points to the winner of the annual regular season women's tennis match.
 3 points to the higher finisher at the American Athletic Conference Women's Indoor Track & Field Championship
 3 points to the higher finisher at the American Athletic Conference Women's Outdoor Track & Field Championship
 3 points to the winner of each regular season volleyball match (2 matches per year)
 In the event of a tie in the overall competition, the athletic program that scores higher in the annual NCAA Graduation Success Rate will be awarded 1 extra point and crowned as the champion for that season. In the unlikely event that this is also tied, the series ends as a tie for that season and the previous winner retains the trophy.

Only regular season matches are counted toward War on I-4 point totals for the 10 sports in which the teams compete head to head, meaning if the teams meet in a conference or NCAA tournament that game doesn't count for War on I-4 competition purposes. The winner each year will take possession of a large trophy shaped like an Interstate road sign, which will be displayed on their campus for the following year. One side of the trophy reads "Tampa" and features the USF logo while the other reads "Orlando" and features the UCF logo. The winner of the annual Thanksgiving weekend football clash receives a similarly shaped "War On I-4" trophy. As of 2020, USF leads UCF in the all-time series for football (6–5), men's basketball (23–16), women's basketball (28–13), baseball (75–69), softball (18–12), men's soccer (26–7–4), men's tennis (34–8), women's tennis (19–7) and volleyball (49–39). UCF only leads in women's soccer (11–4–4), but UCF has won all three overall War on I-4 titles since 2016, and led USF in the 2019–2020 edition of the rivalries, but the title was not awarded due to spring sports being canceled by the NCAA because of COVID-19.

Spirit programs

Cheerleading
The UCF cheerleading squad has captured three national titles at the D1 College Cheerleading and Dance Team Nationals, in 2003, 2007 and 2020. UCF cheerleading has received a spot in the top three in the country the last six seasons in the national championship, and has earned a top-10 finish 17 times in the last 19 years. In 2008, the WE Original weekly series Cheerleader U followed the UCF cheerleaders through an entire season. In 2013, the 2003 UCF Cheerleading Team, who won the UCA College Cheerleading Division IA national championship in 2003, was the first team inducted into the UCF Athletics Hall of Fame.

Marching Knights and KnightMoves

The Marching Knights were formed after the start of the football program in 1979, and is the largest and most visible student organization at the university. They are known for their high energy performances, unique and contemporary drill designs, and musical selections ranging from jazz, to pop, to classical. Over 300 members perform for fans at each home UCF football game and select away games, as well as any bowl games.

The university's coordinated dance team, KnightMoves, is considered to be one of the nation's top college programs, and features 12-18 girls each year. The team performs year round at school and athletic events, such as Spirit Splash, pep rally's, and football and basketball games. KnightMoves has finished in the top-10 at the College Cheerleading and Dance Team Nationals for the past two-years.

Cheers

"Black and gold" is a cheer that is very popular at home games, with one part of the student section yelling "Black!", and the other part of the section answering back with their loudest "Gold!"  This can go back and forth for several minutes, with both sides competing to be the louder.

Another popular cheer at games occurs during the national anthem when students loudly exclaim "Knight" during the line, "Gave proof through the night that our flag was still there." This cheer is controversial within the fanbase, with many fans finding it disrespectful. 

The University of Central Florida Fight Song is titled 'Charge On'.

In 2019, the UCF Cheerleading Team became national champions in the UCA Division 1A Gameday division.

Athletic facilities
Since 2000, the UCF has invested significant capital and effort in the construction, expansion and improvements of its major sports programs and their facilities. In 2007, UCF opened the new 45,000–seat FBC Mortgage Stadium, and the new 10,000 seat Addition Financial Arena. In 2011, the university renovated the UCF Soccer and Track Stadium, increasing capacity to over 2,000 and adding amenities such as clubhouses and restrooms. In 2011, UCF completed a major renovation of John Euliano Park, expanding it to a total capacity at 4,180.

Notable alumni

As a competitor in college athletics, UCF has many notable student athletes, coaches and staff members, such as NFL players Blake Bortles, A. J. Bouye, Daunte Culpepper, Gabe Davis, Richie Grant, Brandon Marshall, Latavius Murray, Matt Prater, Josh Sitton, Asante Samuel, and twin brothers Shaquem and Shaquill Griffin; former NBA guard Jermaine Taylor and current NBA center Tacko Fall; NASCAR driver Aric Almirola; and soccer stars Michelle Akers and Sean Johnson. Currently, more than 50 UCF alumni compete in professional basketball, football, baseball and golf.

Athletic directors

See also
List of college athletic programs in Florida

References

External links

 
Knights Email

 
1970 establishments in Florida